Charles Sabourin (19 June 1849 – 6 November 1920) was a French pathologist and pulmonologist.

Early life 
On 19 June 1849, Sabourin was born in Châtellerault, Vienne, France.

Education 
Sabourin studied medicine in Paris, France.

Career 
Sabourin served in hospitals of Paris. He specialized in medical research and therapy, receiving recognition for his work involving lung anatomy and pathology. Subsequently, he opened a sanatorium in Durtol for treating patients with tuberculosis and pulmonary tuberculosis.

He was first physician to provide a comprehensive description of nodular regenerative hyperplasia of the liver. In French medical literature the eponym Cirrhose alcoolo-tuberculeuse de Hutinel et Sabourin is used to describe hypertrophic fatty cirrhosis of the liver of alcoholic or tuberculous origin. It is named along with physician Victor Henri Hutinel (1849–1933).

Today, the Hôpital-sanatorium Sabourin, north of Clermont-Ferrand, is named in his honour.

Publications 
• La glande biliare et l'hyperplasia nodulaire du foie. Revue de médecine, Paris, 1884, 4: 322–333.

References 

 Hospital Sabourin (biography)(bad link)

1920 deaths
1849 births
People from Vienne
French pathologists